The Elite Panel of ICC Umpires is a panel of cricket umpires appointed by the International Cricket Council to officiate in Test matches and One Day Internationals around the world. The panel was first established in April 2002 when the ICC decided to reform the way that international cricket was umpired. The main change was that both umpires in a Test match and one of the umpires in a One Day International are now independent of the competing nations, whereas before 2002 just one of the umpires in a Test was independent and in ODIs both umpires were from the home nation. The majority of these ICC appointments are fulfilled by the members of the Elite Panel, who are generally thought to be the best umpires in the world. As such the ICC hopes to ensure that umpiring standards are as high as possible. Members of the panel stand in around 10 Tests and 15 ODIs each year. The list of umpires in the panel is revised every year by the ICC Umpires Selection Panel.

History
The panel was formed in 2002 with eight members. Peter Willey was invited to be on the panel, but declined the opportunity because it would have required him to spend too much time away from his family. The last members of the original panel retired in 2011. The original eight panel members were: Steve Bucknor, Daryl Harper, Ashoka de Silva, Srinivas Venkataraghavan, Rudi Koertzen, Dave Orchard, David Shepherd and Russell Tiffin.

Members of the International Panel of ICC Umpires stand in ODIs in their home countries, and may be appointed by the ICC to Tests and ODIs as an independent officials at busy times in the cricket calendar to supplement the Elite Panel. The best performing umpires may earn promotion to the Elite Panel. Emirates sponsors the panel, and the umpires are required to wear shirts and coats which have 'Fly Emirates' printed on them whenever they are officiating. In July 2019, Michael Gough and Joel Wilson were added to the Elite panel following the retirement of Ian Gould and exclusion of Sundaram Ravi after the 2019 Cricket World Cup.

On 16 March 2023, Ahsan Raza and Adrian Holdstock joined the panel after Aleem Dar stepped down from the panel.

, Australia and England have jointly provided the most panel members with seven. South Africa with four, India, Pakistan, New Zealand, and West Indies have provided three; Sri Lanka has provided two; and Zimbabwe has provided just one member. No members have featured from the Bangladesh, Afghanistan and Ireland, among the Full members.

Current members

 cricket season the Elite Panel consists of:

Former members
The first departures from the panel came in 2004 when Srinivas Venkataraghavan (known as Venkat) retired, and Asoka de Silva, Dave Orchard and Russell Tiffin did not have their contracts renewed. David Shepherd retired in 2005 following 22 years as an international umpire. Darrell Hair, who joined the panel in 2003, was banned from officiating in matches involving full ICC members following the Ball tampering controversy in August 2006. In March 2008, following a spell officiating associate members, Hair was once again permitted to umpire full members, but in August he handed in his resignation after he was only allowed to officiate in two tests.

Steve Bucknor retired in 2009, having stood in a then record 128 Tests since March 1989. Rudi Koertzen retired in 2010, while Mark Benson, who had joined the panel in 2006, stood down to return to domestic cricket. Asoka de Silva, who rejoined the panel in 2008, was stood down again in 2011 along with Daryl Harper, Simon Taufel and Billy Doctrove retired in 2012 and Steve Davis retired in 2015. Sundaram Ravi was dropped from the panel after 2019 Cricket World Cup. Ian Gould retired from the panel after the 2019 World Cup. Bruce Oxenford retired from the panel in 2021.

Former elite panel members can still umpire in ODIs and international T20s. Statistics correct as of 31 January 2021.
 Original panel member

^de Silva was absent from the panel between 2004 and 2008.

Records

Test matches 
Most Test matches as an umpire:

ODI matches 
Most ODI matches as an umpire:

T20I matches 
Most T20I matches as an umpire:

See also
Panel of ICC Referees
International Panel of ICC Umpires
List of Test umpires
ICC Associates and Affiliates Umpire Panel

References

External links
ICC match officials

Cricket umpiring
International Cricket Council